The Western Himalayan alpine shrub and meadows is a montane grasslands and shrublands ecoregion of Nepal, India, and Tibet, which lies between the tree line and snow line in the western portion of the Himalaya Range.

Setting
The alpine shrub and meadows lie between approximately  elevation.

The Eastern Himalayan alpine shrub and meadows lie east of the Kali Gandaki gorge, while the Northwestern Himalayan alpine shrub and meadows lies west of the Sutlej. Below  lie the Western Himalayan subalpine conifer forests. Permanent ice and snow lies above . To the north, the Western Himalayan alpine shrub and meadows transition to the drier Central Tibetan Plateau alpine steppe of central Tibet. The Karakoram-West Tibetan Plateau alpine steppe lies to the southwest.

Flora
Alpine shrublands, dominated by rhododendrons, predominate at lower elevations close to the treeline.

Above the shrublands are alpine meadows, known as bugyals or bughiyals, which support a variety of herbaceous plants, including species of Anaphalis, Cyananthus, Jurinea, Morina, Potentilla, Gentiana, Delphinium, Meconopsis, Pedicularis, Anemone, Aster, Polygonum, Primula, and Saussurea. In the spring and summer, the alpine meadows are covered with brightly colored flowers.

On the upper slopes, low plants of genera Saxifraga, Allium, Corydalis, Eriophyton, Stellaria, Soroseris, and Cremanthodium grow among the boulders and scree.

An alpine steppe of Caragana pygma, C. gerardiana, Lonicera spinosa, Juniperus squamata, Juniperus indica, Ephedra gerardiana, Hippophae tibetana, Myricaria rosea, Lonicera spinulosa, and Berberis can be found in drier parts of the ecoregion.

Fauna
Large mammals include the snow leopard (Uncia uncia), bharal or Himalayan blue sheep (Pseudois nayaur), Himalayan tahr (Hemitragus jemlahicus), Himalayan musk deer (Moschus chrysogaster), and mainland serow (Capricornis sumatraensis). Smaller mammals include weasels and pikas.

Conservation
Several protected areas lie within or partly within the ecoregion, including:
Royal Dhorpatan Hunting Reserve (Nepal)
Govind Pashu Vihar Wildlife Sanctuary (Uttarakhand, India)
Lippa Asrang Wildlife Sanctuary (Himachal Pradesh, India)
Sangla Wildlife Sanctuary (Raksham Chitkul) (Himachal Pradesh, India)
Gangotri National Park (Uttarakhand, India)
Kedarnath Wild Life Sanctuary (Uttarakhand, India)
Valley of Flowers National Park (Uttarakhand, India)
Nanda Devi National Park (Uttarakhand, India)
Shey-Phoksundo National Park (Nepal)
Annapurna Conservation Area (Nepal)

See also
List of ecoregions in India

References

 
 

Ecoregions of China
Ecoregions of India
Ecoregions of Nepal
Ecoregions of the Himalayas

Montane grasslands and shrublands
Palearctic ecoregions